The age of criminal responsibility in Europe refers to the age below which an individual is considered to be unsuitable for being held accountable for their criminal offence, and in this case, how it is handled under different areas of European jurisdiction. In the United States it is also known as "defense of infancy". The most common age of criminal responsibility in Europe is 14.

Countries
Switzerland: 10
United Kingdom (except Scotland): 10
Scotland: 12
Andorra: 12
Hungary: 12
Ireland: 12
Netherlands: 12
Albania: 14
Austria: 14
Germany: 14
Norway: 15
Portugal : 16

Norway

De jure 
Everyone aged 16 and above can be sent to prison and get equal punishment as an adult. If someone under the age of 16 is intoxicated, seen outside alone after 22:00 or trespassing, the police can detain or drive the individual home. If they choose to detain them at a police station, they can be detained for a maximum of 4 hours. If the police notices someone under the age of 16 doing criminal acts, the police can decide to have obligatory meetings with the teen/child and the parents. This can only happen if the criminal is under the age of 18.

De facto 
People under the age of 18 rarely gets imprisoned. There are rarely more than 10 people under the age of 18 imprisoned in Norway. This is because judges rarely finds it ethical to imprison youths, and the organization "Barneombudet" which advises heavily against imprisoning youths. First-time criminals under the age of 18 doing petty crimes usually get no punishment and get released with only a warning.

Portugal 
Persons under the age of 16 cannot be held criminally liable. Persons aged between 12 and 16 can be subject to penalties under the Guardianship and Education Law, which allows for the detention of children in closed educational centres. [Criminal Code, Article 19; Lei Tutelar Educativa 1999 (Guardianship and Education Law), Articles 1 and 4]

See also
Drinking age

References

Age of criminal responsibility